Matthew Theodore Gregory (born October 29, 1968) is a former Attorney General of the Northern Mariana Islands. He was appointed in January 2006 and served until 27 September 2008. After Gregory's departure, he was succeeded as acting Attorney General by Deputy Attorney General Gregory 
Baka for nearly eleven months.  Eventually, Assistant Attorney General Edward Taylor Buckingham, III was confirmed as Attorney General on August 14, 2009.

References

Living people
Attorneys General of the Northern Mariana Islands
Northern Mariana Islands lawyers
American lawyers
Northern Mariana Islands politicians
1968 births